Haswell is a surname. Notable people with the surname include:

Anthony Haswell (passenger rail advocate), b. 1931, American lawyer 
Anthony Haswell (printer) (1756–1816), British-American newspaper publisher and postmaster of the Vermont Republic
Archibald Eliot Haswell Miller (1887—1979), Scottish artist, appears simply with surname Miller or with dual surname Haswell Miller
Carole Ann Haswell, astrophysicist
Charles Haynes Haswell (1809–1907), American nautical engineer, politician and author
Elizabeth Haswell, American biologist
Jock Haswell, pseudonym of Chetwynd John Drake Haswell (1919-2018), English military and intelligence author
John Haswell (1812–1897), Scottish-Austrian locomotive design engineer
Josephine Haswell Miller (1890-1975), born Elizabeth Josephine Cameron, Scottish artist, wife of Archibald E. Haswell Miller
Keeley Halswelle (1831-1891), born John Keeley Haswell, British artist
Percy Haswell  (1871–1945), American actress
Robert Haswell (1768–1801?), American maritime trader and naval officer
Russell Haswell (born 1970), British multidisciplinary artist
Susanna Rowson (1762–1824), born Susanna Haswell, British-American actress, novelist and educator
Thomas Haswell (1807–1889), British educator and music composer
William Aitcheson Haswell (1854–1925), Scottish-Australian zoologist

See also
Wyndham Halswelle (1882–1915), British Olympian and soldier, sometimes referred to as Haswell in contemporary accounts